Gymnodoris is a genus of sea slugs, dorid nudibranchs, shell-less marine gastropod molluscs in the family Polyceridae.

Species
Species in the genus Gymnodoris include:

Gymnodoris alba (Bergh, 1877)
Gymnodoris amakusana (Baba, 1996)
Gymnodoris arnoldi (Burn, 1957)
Gymnodoris aurita (Gould, 1852)
Gymnodoris ceylonica (Kelaart, 1858)
Gymnodoris citrina (Bergh, 1875)
 Gymnodoris inariensis Hamatani & Osumi, 2004
Gymnodoris inornata Bergh, 1880
Gymnodoris nigricolor  Baba, 1960
 Gymnodoris okinawae Baba, 1936
 Gymnodoris pattani Swennen, 1996
Gymnodoris rubropapulosa (Bergh, 1905)
Gymnodoris striata (Eliot, 1908)
Gymnodoris subflava Baba, 1949
Species brought into synonymy
Gymnodoris impudica (Rüppell & Leuckart, 1828) synonym of Gymnodoris rubropapulosa

References

Polyceridae